Centerville may refer to several places in Kentucky, generally named for their position near the center of their respective counties:

 Centerville, Bourbon County, Kentucky
 Centerville, Crittenden County, Kentucky, the former county seat of Livingston Co
 Centerville, Scott County, Kentucky
 Kirksville, Kentucky, formerly the "Centerville" in Madison Co.
 Bradfordsville, Kentucky, formerly the "Centerville" in Marion Co.
 Centertown, Kentucky, formerly the "Centerville" in Ohio Co.

See also
 Center, Kentucky, in Metcalfe Co.
 Central City, Kentucky, in Muhlenberg Co.
 Center Point, Kentucky, in Monroe Co.
 Magnolia, Kentucky, formerly "Center Point" in LaRue Co.
 Centerville (disambiguation)